Engel im Fegefeuer is an East German film. It was released in 1964.

External links
 

1964 films
East German films
1960s German-language films
Films directed by Herrmann Zschoche
Films set in 1918
Films set on the German home front during World War I
Films about rebellions
1960s German films